Ruth Wisse (surname pronounced ) (Yiddish: רות װײַס;  Roskies; born May 13, 1936) is a Canadian academic and is the Martin Peretz Professor of Yiddish Literature and Professor of Comparative Literature at Harvard University emerita. She is a noted scholar of Yiddish literature and of Jewish history and culture.

Background and family
Wisse was born into a Jewish family in Czernowitz in what is today Ukraine, but was then part of Romania. She grew up in Montreal, Canada and earned her MA from Columbia University, and in 1969 her PhD from McGill University. She is the sister of David Roskies, professor of Yiddish and Jewish literature at the Jewish Theological Seminary.

Career
Wisse, whose doctorate was in literature, is described by literary scholar Edward Alexander as one of a group of scholars who earned PhDs in English literature in the 1960s, but  moved into Jewish Studies in the 1970s and 1980s, applying the modern critical methods of literary scholarship to Yiddish and Hebrew texts. Wisse describes Saul Bellow as her favorite English-language novelist.

Wisse has taught at McGill, Stanford, New York, Hebrew and Tel Aviv universities. While teaching at McGill she developed a "pioneering" graduate program in Jewish studies". She left McGill to teach at Harvard in January 1993.

According to one critic, Wisse's work has been characterized "by the sharpness of her insight, by her unwillingness to retreat from a skirmish and by the inability of even those who disagree with her to deny her brilliance." She won the 1988 Itzik Manger Prize for Yiddish literature. She received one of the 2007 National Humanities Medals. The award cited her for "scholarship and teaching that have illuminated Jewish literary traditions. Her insightful writings have enriched our understanding of Yiddish literature and Jewish culture in the modern world."

She is a member of the Editorial Board of the Jewish Review of Books and a frequent contributor to Commentary. She dedicated her last book, Jews and Power, to the editor, Neal Kozodoy.

Yiddish literature
Joyce Carol Oates described The Best Of Sholem Aleichem, a collection of short stories by Sholem Aleichem which Wisse edited with Irving Howe as, "Like all good anthologies...  more than simply a heterogeneous collection of pieces linked by common theme or author: it is also a statement, an argument, an attempt at redefinition."

Schlemiel
The Schlemiel as a Modern Hero, Wisse's first book, a rewriting of her doctoral dissertation "in a vigorously fresh and witty style," is about the schlemiel as both a type and a literary genre with its origins in the Yiddish literature in the period of Jewish emancipation.

Jewish history
Wisse has published notable books and essays on contemporary Jewish history, including If I Am Not for Myself: The Liberal Betrayal of the Jews (1992) and Jews and Power (2008).

Political views
Wisse's politics have generally been described as neoconservative.

She has angered feminists by arguing in favor of traditional marriage and gender roles, condemned Jewish participation in Communism and has highlighted Jewish culpability for its crimes. Wisse's criticism of the women's liberation movement as a form of neo-Marxism has been extensively cited by critics of radical feminist politics. She wrote:

"Most of all," according to a May 2014 profile in The Forward, Wisse has been "one of the most forceful conservative voices in support of Israel, arguing that criticism of the state repeats ingrained habits of Jewish accommodationism and self-blame." She sees no moral equivalence between the Arab and Israeli sides in the Middle Eastern conflict:

Wisse has been criticized for writing that "Palestinian Arabs [are] people who breed and bleed and advertise their misery" According to Alexander Cockburn, Wisse is bothered by the "failure of nerve" of American Jewish intellectuals and their "squeamishness about the shootings and beatings meted out to the breeders". Following protests and Harvard University's decision to cancel Marty Peretz's speech after Peretz wrote "Muslim life is cheap, especially to other Muslims", Wisse condemned "Groupthink" at Harvard and defended Peretz, saying that "to wish that Muslims would condemn the violence in their midst is not bigotry but liberality". Wisse is a member of the International Advisory Board of NGO Monitor.

Books
 Free As A Jew, A Personal Memoir of National Self-Liberation (2021). Post Hill Press.  
 
 A Little Love in Big Manhattan (1988)
 If I Am Not for Myself: The Liberal Betrayal of the Jews (1992)
 
 
 

Books edited
 
 The Best of Sholem Aleichem, Introduction by Irving Howe and Wisse. (1979)
 The Penguin Book of Modern Yiddish Verse, co-edited by Irving Howe (1988)
 The I.L. Peretz Reader (1996)

Translations
 The I.L. Peretz Reader, by Isaac Loeb Peretz (1996)
 The Well, by Chaim Grade; original title: Der brunemFestschriftArguing the Modern Jewish Canon: Essays on Literature and Culture in Honor of Ruth R. Wisse, ed. Justin Cammy et al., Center for Jewish Studies, Harvard University: distributed by Harvard University Press, 2008.

 Awards 

 2000: National Jewish Book Award in Scholarship for The Modern Jewish Canon: A Journey through Language and Culture''

References

External links
 
 Wisse receiving the 2007 National Humanities Medal

1936 births
Living people
Romanian Ashkenazi Jews
Jewish Canadian writers
Harvard University faculty
Jewish American writers
American people of Romanian-Jewish descent
Linguists of Yiddish
Columbia Graduate School of Arts and Sciences alumni
Academic staff of McGill University
Romanian emigrants to Canada
Stanford University faculty
New York University faculty
Academic staff of the Hebrew University of Jerusalem
Academic staff of Tel Aviv University
National Humanities Medal recipients
Neoconservatism
21st-century American Jews
American Ashkenazi Jews
Itzik Manger Prize recipients